The Second Marx cabinet (German: Zweites Kabinett Marx) was the 11th democratically elected government during the Weimar Republic. The cabinet was named after Chancellor Wilhelm Marx and took office on 3 June 1924 when it replaced the First Marx cabinet which had resigned on 26 May. Marx's second cabinet resigned on 15 December 1924 and was replaced on 15 January 1925 by a cabinet led by Hans Luther.

Establishment
On 15 February 1924, the Ermächtigungsgesetz (enabling act), on which many of the actions of the first Marx cabinet had been based, lapsed and there was no prospect of the Reichstag granting an extension. The parliament met on 20 February and several draft laws were tabled, aimed at undoing some of the government's decrees, notably on taxes, working hours and cuts to the public workforce. The government decided to fight to keep these in place as it saw them as cornerstones of its economic and fiscal policies. The opposition parties refused to withdraw their motions. Chancellor Marx thus asked for the Reichstag to be dissolved on 13 March, arguing that "vital" decrees would otherwise be revoked. The elections of 4 May weakened the parties of the political center and strengthened the extremes of the spectrum. The German Democratic Party (DDP) and German People's Party (DVP) in particular lost votes. The German National People's Party (DNVP), in conjunction with the Agricultural League, now had the largest parliamentary group and demanded to be included in the government in a leading role.

Since the implementation of the Dawes Plan, which aimed to resolve the problems around Germany's World War I reparations, required a government able to act with decision, the cabinet tried to stay on as caretaker until the new Reichstag assembled. This resulted in criticism both from the DNVP, which called for the cabinet's resignation on 15 May, and from within the coalition parties. Coalition talks started on 21 May, but the DNVP refused to agree to the Dawes Plan (which they had labelled a "second Versailles" during the election campaign). Moreover, their preferred candidate for the chancellorship, Alfred von Tirpitz proved very controversial.

On 26 May, the DVP forced the cabinet to resign. President Friedrich Ebert asked Marx to form a new government. The DNVP demanded a change in foreign policy, the dismissal of Gustav Stresemann as foreign minister and a firm pledge regarding a reshuffling of the Prussian state government (to include the DNVP). On 3 June, Marx broke off the negotiations and that same day all the ministers were confirmed in their posts. The BVP was not a part of the new coalition. The Centre Party, DDP and DVP thus formed the coalition on which the second Marx cabinet was based.

Overview of the members
The members of the cabinet were as follows:

Notes: state secretary, Curt Joël was acting head of the justice ministry. Similarly, state secretary Rudolf Krohne took over at transport after the minister resigned.

Resignation

The parties on which the coalition was based had only 138 out of 472 votes in the Reichstag. Its foreign policy was mostly supported by the Social Democratic Party (SPD). However, the DVP was interested in getting parliamentary support for key decisions from the DNVP and to add them to the coalition. One reason was that the DVP viewed the DNVP as its main rival for the public vote and wanted to include them in the government, thereby forcing them to accept responsibility for the Reich's policies. In negotiations in October 1924, however, the DDP refused to accept government participation by the DNVP. Attempts by Marx to get agreement by the DDP to tolerate a cabinet based on the Centre Party, DVP and DNVP failed and he thus asked Ebert to dissolve the Reichstag (elected not even six months previously), which the president did on 20 October.

The economic situation improved considerably in 1924 and this was a key factor in the shift of votes from extreme to centre parties in the election of 7 December. Communists and Nazis lost votes, whilst both Social Democrats and DNVP posted gains. This made it an open question whether the new government should include the former or the latter. Arithmetically, both a SPD/Centre/DDP/DVP or Centre/DDP/DVP/DNVP coalition would have been able to rely on a Reichstag majority. However, the DVP rejected the possibility of governing with the SPD. As a result, Marx announced the cabinet's resignation on 15 December (it stayed in office as caretaker). Negotiations on a new cabinet then proved as difficult as they had been prior to the elections. They soon were broken off and a resumption postponed until early January 1925.

In these talks none of the parties moved from their earlier positions. A government based on a parliamentary majority thus proved elusive. Once again, the idea of a "government of personages" was considered, i.e. of individuals not representing parties at all. Marx offered two politicians of the DNVP seats in a new "non-partisan" cabinet, but both DVP and DNVP rejected this. A final attempt by Marx to retain a cabinet based just on the Centre and DDP failed, and on 9 January he informed Ebert that he was unable to form a new government. On 15 January, Hans Luther (not a member of any party) succeeded in putting together a cabinet of technocrats and "trusted men" based on a loose combination of parties from the Centre Party to the DNVP. The first Luther cabinet replaced Marx' government that day.

References

Marx II
Marx II
1924 establishments in Germany
Cabinets established in 1924
Cabinets disestablished in 1924